A Study in Jazz is the fourth album by American jazz saxophonist Eddie Harris, and the first to feature his compositions predominantly, recorded in 1962 and released on the Vee-Jay label.

Track listing
All compositions by Eddie Harris except as indicated
 "No One" - 3:45 
 "Dancing Bull" - 4:15 
 "Cuttin' Out" - 3:52 
 "Down" - 4:55 
 "Fantastic Waltz" - 4:41
 "Just Friends" (John Klenner, Sam M. Lewis) - 4:28 
 "Olifant Gesang" - 8:13

Personnel
Eddie Harris - tenor saxophone
Willie Pickens - piano
Joe Diorio - (tracks 2–7), Roland Faulkner (track 1) - guitar
Richard Evans (tracks 6 & 7), Donald Garrett (track 5), Melvin Jackson (tracks 1-4) - bass
Harold Jones (tracks 1, 3 & 4), Earl Thomas (track 5), Marshall Thompson (tracks 2, 6 & 7) - drums
Jon Avant - trombone (track 5)
Charles Stepney - vibraphone (track 5)

References 

Eddie Harris albums
1962 albums
Vee-Jay Records albums